1244 Deira is a dark background asteroid and slow rotator from the inner region of the asteroid belt. It was discovered on 25 May 1932, by English-born South African astronomer Cyril Jackson at the Union Observatory in Johannesburg, who named it after Deira, an old kingdom near his birthplace, the market town of Ossett, located in West Yorkshire, England.

Orbit and classification 

Deira is a non-family asteroid of the main belt's background population when applying the hierarchical clustering method to its proper orbital elements. It orbits the Sun in the inner asteroid belt at a distance of 2.1–2.6 AU once every 3 years and 7 months (1,310 days; semi-major axis 2.34 AU). Its orbit has an eccentricity of 0.10 and an inclination of 9° with respect to the ecliptic.

Naming 

This minor planet was named by the discoverer Cyril Jackson after his birthplace, the market town of Ossett, located in West Yorkshire, England (also see ). The official naming citation was mentioned in The Names of the Minor Planets by Paul Herget in 1955. While the naming citation reads that Deira is the ancient name for his birthplace, the Celtic Kingdom of Deira was actually much larger, encompassing at its height most of Yorkshire in Northern England.

Physical characteristics 

Deira has been characterized as a primitive P-type asteroid by the space-based Wide-field Infrared Survey Explorer (WISE). While P-type bodies are common in the outermost asteroid belt and among the Jupiter trojans, they are rarely found in the inner main belt. In both the Tholen- and SMASS-like taxonomy of the Small Solar System Objects Spectroscopic Survey (S3OS2), Deira is an X-type asteroid.

Rotation period 

In March 2011, a rotational lightcurve of Deira was obtained from photometric observations by Julian Oey at his Leura Observatory in Australia. Lightcurve analysis gave a rotation period of 210.6 hours with a brightness variation of 0.5 magnitude, while Oey previously published a slightly longer period of 217.1 hours and an amplitude of 0.6 magnitude. This makes Deira one of the Top 300 slow rotators known to exist.

Spin axis 

In 2016, an international study modeled a lightcurve with a concurring period of 216.98 hours and found two spin axis of (314.0°, −46.0°) and (107.0°, −56.0°) in ecliptic coordinates (λ, β).

Diameter and albedo 

According to the surveys carried out by the Infrared Astronomical Satellite IRAS, the Japanese Akari satellite and the NEOWISE mission of NASA's WISE telescope, Deira measures between 28.816 and 35.19 kilometers in diameter and its surface has an albedo between 0.03 and 0.0557.

The Collaborative Asteroid Lightcurve Link derives an albedo of 0.0465 and a diameter of 30.89 kilometers based on an absolute magnitude of 11.5.

Notes

References

External links 
 Lightcurve Database Query (LCDB), at www.minorplanet.info
 Dictionary of Minor Planet Names, Google books
 Asteroids and comets rotation curves, CdR – Geneva Observatory, Raoul Behrend
 Discovery Circumstances: Numbered Minor Planets (1)-(5000) – Minor Planet Center
 
 

001244
Discoveries by Cyril Jackson (astronomer)
Named minor planets
001244
19320525